Aqcheh Kahriz (also Romanized as Āqcheh Kahrīz; also known as Āqjeh Kahrīz) is a village in Milajerd Rural District, Milajerd District, Komijan County, Markazi Province, Iran. At the 2006 census, its population was 56, in 12 families.

References 

Populated places in Komijan County